Laminacauda maxima is a species of sheet weaver found in Tristan da Cunha. It was described by Millidge in 1985.

References

Linyphiidae
Spiders described in 1985
Fauna of Tristan da Cunha
Spiders of Oceania